The 2013 Lamar Cardinals football team represented Lamar University in the 2013 NCAA Division I FCS football season. The Cardinals were led by fourth-year head coach Ray Woodard and played their home games at Provost Umphrey Stadium. They were a member of the Southland Conference. They finished the season 5–6, 2–4 in Southland play to finish in sixth place.

Media
All Cardinals football games were broadcast on KLVI AM 560 as part of the Lamar Cardinals Radio Network. At least 3 games, including 2 road games, were broadcast on Fox 4 KBTV as the Cardinals completed the fourth year of a five-year deal granting exclusive broadcast rights to select Cardinals games to KBTV. SLC TV will cover 1 game (with a possible option for a 2nd game to end the season), CSN Houston will cover 1 game, and ESPN3 will cover 1 game in addition to the KBTV games. Cardinals SLC TV games will air locally on KUIL-LD.

Before the season

2013 recruits
Lamar signed 20 players on national letter of intent day. Recruits are listed here. Player profiles for each recruit are available at the signing day link below.

3rd Crawfish Bowl
The 3rd Annual Red-White Crayfish Bowl was held Saturday, April 16 at 7 PM. The team was divided into a red and white team, and 4 12-minute quarters were played.

Sources:

The Crawfish Bowl would need overtime to decide the winner. Just as in 2012, it was a Ryan Mossakowski pass that would determine the winner. In overtime, on 2nd and 10, a Mossakowski pass was picked off by Keith Wilson at the 20-yard line. He returned it 80-yards for the game-winning touchdown.

Roster

Schedule

Game summaries

Oklahoma Panhandle State

Sources:

Louisiana Tech

Sources:

Oklahoma State

Sources:

Bacone

Sources:

Grambling State

Sources:

Sam Houston State

Sources:

Central Arkansas

Sources:

Southeastern Louisiana

Sources:

Nicholls State

Sources:

Northwestern State

Sources:

Stephen F. Austin

Sources:

McNeese State

Sources:

Ranking movements

References

Lamar
Lamar Cardinals football seasons
Lamar Cardinals football